David Greenberg is a historian and professor of US history as well as of journalism and media studies at Rutgers University, New Jersey, United States.

US history books 
Greenberg’s Ph.D. thesis won Columbia University’s 2001 Bancroft Dissertation Award and became his first book, Nixon’s Shadow (2003), which won the Washington Monthly Annual Political Book Award and the American Journalism Historians Association's Book Award. Calvin Coolidge (2006), a biography in Henry Holt's American Presidents Series, appeared on the Washington Post’s list of best books of 2007. Presidential Doodles (2006) was widely reviewed and featured on CNN, NPR's All Things Considered, and CBS’s Sunday Morning. Republic of Spin (2016) examines the rise of the White House spin machine, from the Progressive Era to the present day, and the debates that Americans have waged over its implications for democracy. His most recent book, Alan Brinkley (2019), is about the political historian.

As of September 2022, he is writing a biography of Rep. John Lewis, the civil rights leader.

Journalism 
Formerly a full-time journalist, Greenberg is now a contributing editor to Politico Magazine, where he writes a regular column. He previously served as managing editor and acting editor of The New Republic, where he was a contributing editor until 2014. Early in his career, he was the assistant to author Bob Woodward on The Agenda: Inside the Clinton White House (Simon & Schuster, 1994). He has also been a regular contributor to Slate since its founding and has written for The New Yorker, The Atlantic, The Washington Post, The New York Times, Foreign Affairs, Daedalus, Dissent, Raritan, and many other scholarly and popular publications.

Awards 
His awards and honors include the Hiett Prize in 2008, given each year to a single junior scholar in the humanities whose work has had a public influence; a fellowship from the Woodrow Wilson International Center for Scholars; and the Rutgers University Board of Trustees Research Fellowship for Scholarly Excellence. In 2021-22 he was a fellow at the Cullman Center at the New York Public Library. He graduated from Yale University, summa cum laude and Phi Beta Kappa, and earned his PhD from Columbia University.

Bibliography 

 Nixon's Shadow: The History of an Image (W.W. Norton, 2003) 
 Calvin Coolidge (Henry Holt / Times Books, 2006) 
 Presidential Doodles: Two Centuries of Scribbles, Scratches, Squiggles, and Scrawls from the Oval Office squiggles & scrawls from the Oval Office (Basic Books, 2006) 
 Republic of Spin: An Inside History of the American Presidency (W.W. Norton, 2016) 
 Alan Brinkley: A Life in History (Columbia University Press, 2019)

References

External links

Living people
Year of birth missing (living people)
Rutgers University faculty
American historians
Yale University alumni
Columbia University alumni